Elizabeth Ann "Liz" Barnes (married name Laban; born 3 August 1951) is an English former middle-distance runner. She represented Great Britain in the women's 800 metres at the 1976 Montreal Olympics and won a bronze medal in the 800m at the 1980 European Indoor Championships.

Career
As Liz Barnes, she ran her lifetime best for the 800 metres with 2:01.35 on 10 July 1976 in Zurich, before going on to compete at the 1976 Olympic Games in Montreal, where she was eliminated in the heats of the 800m, running 2:01.70, and finished seventh in the final of the 4 × 400m relay, along with Gladys Taylor, Verona Elder and Donna Murray.

At the 1978 Commonwealth Games representing England in Edmonton, Alberta, Canada, Barnes finished fourth in the 800 m final in 2:03.41. Three weeks later, she reached the semifinals at the 1978 European Championships in Prague, running 2:01.69.

Barnes finished second behind Christina Boxer in 2:02.04 at the 1979 UK Championships and third in 2:02.74 behind Chris Benning and Janet Prictoe at the 1979 AAA Championships, before going on to win a bronze medal at the 1980 European Indoor Championships in Sindelfingen. Her time of 2:01.5 moved her to second on the British Indoor all-time list behind Jane Colebrook's 2:01.12 from 1977. She would remain second on the British indoor all-time list until Kelly Holmes ran 1:59.21 in 2003.

International competitions

References

External links
 

1951 births
Living people
Athletes from London
English female sprinters
English female middle-distance runners
British female sprinters
Olympic athletes of Great Britain
Athletes (track and field) at the 1976 Summer Olympics
Commonwealth Games competitors for England
Athletes (track and field) at the 1978 Commonwealth Games
Olympic female sprinters